Gorbals railway station was a railway station serving the Gorbals area of Glasgow, Lanarkshire, Scotland. The station was originally part of the Glasgow, Barrhead and Kilmarnock Joint Railway.

History

The station opened on 1 September 1877 as a partial replacement for Southside station, the previous terminus of the Barrhead branch line which was to be extended to the new St Enoch station which had opened nearly a year earlier. Gorbals station closed to passengers permanently on 1 June 1928. The line through the station remained open and in constant use until St Enoch closed to passenger traffic on 27 June 1966. Freight traffic continued until 1973, when the section from Langside Junction was closed and dismantled.

Future
The Crossrail Glasgow scheme is proposing a new station in this area, close to the location of site of Gorbals.

References

Notes

Sources

External links 
Photographs, maps and plans of disused stations in Gorbals

Railway stations in Great Britain opened in 1877
Railway stations in Great Britain closed in 1928
Former Glasgow, Barrhead and Kilmarnock Joint Railway stations
Disused railway stations in Glasgow
Gorbals